John Carmack may refer to:

John Carmack (born 1970), game programmer
John K. Carmack (born 1931), leader and historian in The Church of Jesus Christ of Latter-day Saints
John Carmack, structural-mechanical designer and contractor and candidate in the United States House of Representatives elections in Washington, 2010